Dixboro United Methodist Church is a historic  church located at 5221 Church Street in Dixboro, Michigan. It was added to the National Register of Historic Places in 1972 and designated a Michigan State Historic Site in 1971. It is significant as a nearly unaltered example of a mid-19th century Greek Revival-style church designed by a professional architect.

History
The first Methodist services in the village of Dixboro were performed in 1828.  For the next 30 years, services were performed sporadically by circuit riders.  Finally, in 1857, a group of Dixboro citizens met, elected a Board of Trustees, and authorized the building of a church for a price not to exceed $2500.  The Board hired Ypsilanti, Michigan architect Abraham Cooper to design the church and  Saline builder E. W. Ford to construct it.  The building was completed in 1858, for a total cost of $2241.

In 1920, a basement was dug underneath the church and a furnace installed. In 1950-51, a wing was added and the cupola was shortened.  In 1969, a second wing was added.  Finally, in 1997-98, the structure was completely renovated, and the cupola was restored to its original height.  The church is still used for weekly services.

Description
The Dixboro United Methodist Church is a single-story, frame, Greek Revival structure topped with a square cupola and belfry.  It is clad in clapboard siding.  The front facade is divided into four bays by Doric pilasters, and a pedimented portico shelters the entrance.  The entrance is flanked by triple-hung sash windows, which continue on each side of the church.

References

Further reading

External links
http://dixborochurch.org/ homepage

Methodist churches in Michigan
Churches on the National Register of Historic Places in Michigan
Greek Revival church buildings in Michigan
Churches completed in 1858
Churches in Washtenaw County, Michigan
Wooden churches in Michigan
National Register of Historic Places in Washtenaw County, Michigan
Michigan State Historic Sites in Washtenaw County, Michigan